Odonterpeton is an extinct genus of microsaur It is known from a single specimen found in Late Carboniferous coal measures in Ohio. It is now considered to be a member of the "microsaur" clade Recumbirostra, and the sister species of Joermungandr from Mazon Creek.

See also
 Prehistoric amphibian
 List of prehistoric amphibians

References

Microsauria
Fossil taxa described in 1909
Prehistoric amphibian genera